Porina grandis is a species of fungus belonging to the family Porinaceae.

It is native Northern Europe.

References

Gyalectales